Salomon is a surname. It originated as a derivative of the Aramaic biblical name Šlāmā (also transliterated as Šlomo), for which the conventional latinization has been Solomon or Salomon. As a surname, Salomon is common among Jews; it has been documented since the Middle Ages even among non-Jews in Western Europe.

Derivatives may include Salmon, Salman and Salamon. The latter form is particularly common in Hungary, and should not be confused with the Venetian family of the same name.

Notable people with the surname 
 Anne Salomon, marine ecologist
 Albert Salomon (surgeon) (1883–1976), German surgeon
 Albert Salomon (1891–1966), German sociologist
 Alice Salomon (1872–1948), German social reformer
 Ben L. Salomon (1914–1944), Medal of Honor recipient, U.S. Army (Battle of Saipan)
 Charles Eberhard Salomon (1824–1881), colonel in the Union Army during the American Civil War
 Charlotte Salomon (1917–1943), German-Jewish artist
 Daniel Salomon (musician) (born 1973), Israeli pop rock singer and musician
 Daniel Salomon (politician) (born 1957), Republican member of the Montana Legislature
 Dieter Salomon (born 1960), mayor of Freiburg, Germany
 Edward Salomon (1828–1909), governor of Wisconsin
 Edward S. Salomon (1836–1913), American Civil War general and governor of the Washington Territory
 Emil Salomonsson (born 1989), Swedish international footballer
 Erich Salomon (1886–1944), German photographer
 Ernst von Salomon (1902–1972), ex-Freikorps member, German writer and one of the assassins of Walther Rathenau
 François Salomon, founder of Salomon Group
 Franz Pfeffer von Salomon (1888–1968), ex-Freikorps member, leader of the SA (1926–1930)
 Frederick Salomon (1826–1897), American Civil War general
 Gavriel Salomon (born 1938), Israeli educational psychologist
 Gotthold Salomon (1784–1862), German rabbi
 Haym Salomon (1740–1785), Jewish businessman and political financial broker, involved in the American Revolutionary War
 Hermann Salomon (1938–2020), German Olympic javelin thrower
 Jakob Salomon (1779–1825), Prussian diplomat and uncle of Felix Mendelssohn
 Johann Peter Salomon (1745–1815), composer and impresario
 Joseph François Salomon (1649–1732), French composer
 Junior Salomon (born 1986), Beninese football player
 Leon E. Salomon (born 1936), US general
 Lysius Salomon (1815–1888), President of Haiti (1879–1888)
 Mark Salomon, US singer
 Matisyohu Salomon, British-US rabbi
 Michael Salomon, US music video and film director
 Mikael Salomon (born 1945), Danish filmmaker
 Otto Salomon (1849–1907), Swedish educator
 Richard G. Salomon (1884–1966), historian of eastern European medieval history
 Richard G. Salomon, professor of Asian studies
 Richard E. Salomon, vice chairman of the board of directors of the Council on Foreign Relations
 Rick Salomon (born 1968), American socialite, film producer and online gambling website owner
 Siegfried Salomon (1885–1962), Danish composer
 Yoel Moshe Salomon (1838–1912), Ottoman newspaper publisher and co-founder of towns

See also 
 Solomon, surname
 Salamon, surname 
 Salmon, surname
Salman, surname

Surnames
Jewish surnames
Yiddish-language surnames
Sephardic surnames